Matt Brash may refer to:

Matt Brash (veterinarian) (born 1963), British veterinarian
Matt Brash (baseball) (born 1998), Canadian baseball pitcher